Ullapara Science College (also referred to as USC) is situated in Jhikira, Ullapara under district Sirajgonj, Bangladesh. It's institute code (EIIN) is 128674. It's MPO number is 8209023101.

History 
M. Akbar Ali, the former MP of Bangladesh was the founder of Ullapara Science College. Ullapara Science College was established on 18 August 1994, in an area of about 5 acres in Jhikira, Ullapara, Sirajganj.

Academics
Ullapara Science College is a co-educative college.

Curriculum
Ullapara Science College's curriculum includes traditional intermediate level academic subjects. Students have to elect one of the four major programs: Arts and Humanities; Commerce; Science; and Business Management(BM).

References

External links 
 Ullapara Science College listing on digitalsirajganj.com

Colleges in Sirajganj District
Educational institutions established in 1960
1960 establishments in East Pakistan